Aboud Omar (born 9 September 1992) is a Kenyan professional footballer who last played as a left-back for Greek Super League 2 club AEL and the Kenya national team.

Career
Born in Mombasa, Aboud Omar began his career at local side Admiral in the second tier of Kenyan football. In early 2011, he was loaned to Kenyan Premier League club Bandari.

In June 2013, Omar joined Kenyan Premier League defending Champions Tusker where he won 2013 Kenyan Super Cup (post-season).

After two years at Tusker, Omar signed with Greek club Panegialios in August 2015. He made his debut in a 0–0 home draw against Acharnaikos on 27 September. Omar played half of the season, appearing 15 times in the league.

Slavia Sofia
On 9 February 2016, Omar signed a contract with Bulgarian side Slavia Sofia, after a successful trial period with the club. He made his competitive debut against Botev Plovdiv on 3 March, playing the full 90 minutes. As a result, he became the first Kenyan footballer to play in the Bulgarian top league.

On 30 June 2016, Omar marked his European debut with an assist for a Serder Serderov goal in a 1–0 home win against Zagłębie Lubin in their 2016–17 Europa League first qualifying round first leg tie.

On 20 April 2018, Omar was sacked by Slavia with immediate effect. In a statement, Slavia president Ventseslav Stefanov alleged that Omar had insulted his teammates and disrespected Bulgaria. Omar said he wanted to refer the matter to FIFA.

Cercle Brugge
On 15 June 2018, Omar signed with Belgian club Cercle Brugge.

Career statistics

International
He made his debut on 9 July 2013.

Honours

Club 
 Bandari
 Labour Day Cup: 2013

 Tusker
 Kenyan Super Cup: 2013
 Kenyan Super Cup: 2014
 Kenya Top 8 Cup: 2013
 Kenya Top 8 Cup: 2014
 Slavia Sofia
 Bulgarian Cup: 2017–18
Ionikos
Super League Greece 2: 2020–21

International 
 Kenya
 CECAFA Senior Challenge Cup: 2013

References

External links 
 Profile at soka.co.ke
 
 

1992 births
Living people
Kenyan Muslims
Sportspeople from Mombasa
Kenyan footballers
Association football defenders
Admiral F.C. players
Bandari F.C. (Kenya) players
Tusker F.C. players
Panegialios F.C. players
PFC Slavia Sofia players
Cercle Brugge K.S.V. players
Sepsi OSK Sfântu Gheorghe players
Kenyan Premier League players
Football League (Greece) players
First Professional Football League (Bulgaria) players
Belgian Pro League players
Liga I players
Kenya international footballers
2019 Africa Cup of Nations players
Kenyan expatriate footballers
Kenyan expatriate sportspeople in Greece
Kenyan expatriate sportspeople in Bulgaria
Kenyan expatriate sportspeople in Belgium
Kenyan expatriate sportspeople in Romania
Expatriate footballers in Greece
Expatriate footballers in Bulgaria
Expatriate footballers in Belgium
Expatriate footballers in Romania